Inseparable is a 2011 genre-bending Chinese film written and directed by Dayyan Eng. The dramedy/psychological suspense stars Kevin Spacey, Daniel Wu and Gong Beibi. Inseparable premiered in 2011 at the Busan International Film Festival and was released in China in May 2012. The film was selected by the Wall Street Journal as one of the "Top 10 Most Notable Asian Films" of 2011. Kevin Spacey's involvement made him the first Hollywood star to headline a 100% Chinese-funded film.

Synopsis 
Having gone through recent losses in his life, and having continued problems at work and at home with his investigative-reporter wife (Gong Beibi), Li (Daniel Wu) is befriended by a mysterious American expat (Kevin Spacey).

Cast

References

External links 
 
 
 

2011 films
2010s Mandarin-language films
2011 comedy-drama films
2011 comedy films
2011 drama films
Chinese comedy-drama films
Films scored by Nathan Wang
2010s English-language films
2011 multilingual films
Chinese multilingual films